The Federal-State Relations Select Committee (Malay: Jawatankuasa Pilihan Khas Hubungan Antara Negeri-Negeri dan Persekutuan; ; Tamil: மலேசிய கூட்டாட்சி மற்றும் மாநில உறவுகள் தேர்வுக் குழு) is one of many select committees of the Malaysian House of Representatives. It is among six new bipartisan parliamentary select committees announced by Speaker of the House of Representatives, Mohamad Ariff Md Yusof, on 4 December 2018 in an effort to improve the institutional system.

Membership

14th Parliament 
As of December 2020, the Committee's current members are as follows:

Former members of the committee are as follows:

Chair of the Federal-State Relations Select Committee

See also 
 Parliamentary Committees of Malaysia

References 

Parliament of Malaysia
Committees of the Parliament of Malaysia
Committees of the Dewan Rakyat